In mathematics, the gluing axiom is introduced to define what a sheaf  on a topological space  must satisfy, given that it is a presheaf, which is by definition a contravariant functor

to a category  which initially one takes to be the category of sets. Here  is the partial order of open sets of  ordered by inclusion maps; and considered as a category in the standard way, with a unique morphism

 is the subset of  With equal image in 

and

.

The first major hurdle in sheaf theory is to see that this gluing or patching axiom is a correct abstraction from the usual idea in geometric situations. For example, a vector field is a section of a tangent bundle on a smooth manifold; this says that a vector field on the union of two open sets is (no more and no less than) vector fields on the two sets that agree where they overlap.

Given this basic understanding, there are further issues in the theory, and some will be addressed here. A different direction is that of the Grothendieck topology, and yet another is the logical status of 'local existence' (see Kripke–Joyal semantics).

Removing restrictions on C
To rephrase this definition in a way that will work in any category  that has sufficient structure, we note that we can write the objects and morphisms involved in the definition above in a diagram which we will call (G), for "gluing":

Here the first map is the product of the restriction maps

and each pair of arrows represents the two restrictions

and

.

One way of understanding the gluing axiom is to notice that  is the colimit of the following diagram:

The gluing axiom says that  turns colimits of such diagrams into limits.

Sheaves on a basis of open sets
In some categories, it is possible to construct a sheaf by specifying only some of its sections. Specifically, let  be a topological space with basis .

B-sheaves are equivalent to sheaves (that is, the category of sheaves is equivalent to the category of B-sheaves). Clearly a sheaf on  can be restricted to a B-sheaf.

The logic of C
The first needs of sheaf theory were for sheaves of abelian groups; so taking the category  as the category of abelian groups was only natural. In applications to geometry, for example complex manifolds and algebraic geometry, the idea of a sheaf of local rings is central. This, however, is not quite the same thing; one speaks instead of a locally ringed space, because it is not true, except in trite cases, that such a sheaf is a functor into a category of local rings. It is the stalks of the sheaf that are local rings, not the collections of sections (which are rings, but in general are not close to being local).

A more careful discussion dispels any mystery here. One can speak freely of a sheaf of abelian groups, or rings, because those are algebraic structures (defined, if one insists, by an explicit signature). In the case of this kind of purely algebraic structure, we can talk either of a sheaf having values in the category of abelian groups, or an abelian group in the category of sheaves of sets; it really doesn't matter.

In the local ring case, it does matter. At a foundational level we must use the second style of definition, to describe what a local ring means in a category. This allows one to specify what a 'local ring in a category' should be, in the case that the category supports enough structure.

Sheafification

To turn a given presheaf  into a sheaf , there is a standard device called sheafification or sheaving. The rough intuition of what one should do, at least for a presheaf of sets, is to introduce an equivalence relation, which makes equivalent data given by different covers on the overlaps by refining the covers.

This use of language strongly suggests that we are dealing here with adjoint functors. Implicit in that is the statement that a morphism of sheaves is nothing more than a natural transformation of the sheaves, considered as functors. Therefore, we get an abstract characterisation of sheafification as left adjoint to the inclusion. In some applications, naturally, one does need a description.

In more abstract language, the sheaves on  form a reflective subcategory of the presheaves (Mac Lane–Moerdijk Sheaves in Geometry and Logic p. 86). In topos theory, for a Lawvere–Tierney topology and its sheaves, there is an analogous result (ibid. p. 227).

Other gluing axioms
The gluing axiom of sheaf theory is rather general. One can note that the Mayer–Vietoris axiom of homotopy theory, for example, is a special case.

See also 
Gluing schemes

Notes

References 

General topology
Limits (category theory)
Homological algebra
Mathematical axioms
Differential topology